The Church of Jesus Christ of Latter-day Saints in the Czech Republic refers to the Church of Jesus Christ of Latter-day Saints (LDS Church) and its members in the Czech Republic.  At year-end 1989, there were less than 100 members in the Czech Republic.  In 2021, there were 2,628 members in 12 congregations.

History

During the Austro-Hungarian Empire

The first missionaries to reach the area now part of the Czech Republic were Thomas Biesinger and Paul Hammer who arrived in Prague during March 1884 as part of a mission to Austria-Hungary. Prostelysing was illegal and Biesinger was convicted for his activities and spent a total of 68 days in captivity. Upon his release he managed to convert one of the witnesses who had got him imprisoned, one Antonin Just, and he would be the first person baptised into the LDS church on Czech soil.

As part of Czechoslovakia

A mission to Czechoslovakia was created July 24, 1929 by John A. Widtsoe and the first Czech language Book of Mormons were printed in February 1933.

In 1936 Wallace Toronto became the second president of the Czechoslovak mission and would remain president for 36 years, a record for LDS mission presidents.

After a brief evacuation of missionaries during the Sudetenland crisis in 1938, the US leaders in the Czechoslovak mission began preparing local members to take over should another evacuation be necessary. Following the German invasion of Czechoslovakia in March 1939 the church reduced the amount of missionary work and focussed mostly on their baptised members. Four American missionaries were arrested by the Gestapo over charges relating to foreign currency and were held in solitary confinement for over a month. Whilst their Mission President negotiated for their release he received word from church headquarters to begin evacuating the Czechoslovak mission. After successfully arranging the release of the missionaries the evacuation was completed by 31 August 1939 In the ten years from the start of the Czechoslovak mission until the evacuation, 137 converts were baptised and 57 missionaries had served.

On 28 June 1946 Toronto and two missionaries entered the country and re-established the mission after a 7-year absence.

In 1949 the, now Communist, government of Czechoslovakia stopped issuing permits to LDS missionaries, effectively rendering their presence in the country illegal. In 1950 the Czechoslovak police arrested two LDS Missionaries and held them incommunicado for three weeks. The Czechoslovak mission was closed shortly afterward when it became apparent that their release was contingent on the mission closure. This had been the only mission in an East European Communist country Local members continued to operate services, though the church was no longer recognised by the government.

Missionaries returned to Czechoslovakia in 1990.

After the Velvet Divorce
In 2016, the LDS Church created its first stake in the Czech Republic.

Stake and congregations

As of February 2023, the following congregations are located in the Prague Czech Republic Stake which encompasses the entire country:

Prague Czech Republic Stake
Odbočka Jihlava (Jihlava Branch)
Odbočka Liberec (Liberec Branch)
Odbočka Olomouc (Olomouc Branch)
Odbočka Třebíč (Třebíč Branch)
Odbočka České Budějovice (České Budějovice Branch)
Sbor Brno (Brno Ward)
Sbor Hradec Králové (Hradec Králové Ward)
Sbor Jičín (Jičín Ward)
Sbor Ostrava (Ostrava Ward)
Sbor Plzeň (Plzeň Ward)
Sbor Praha (Praha Ward)
Sbor Uherské Hradiště (Uherské Hradiště Ward)

Missions
The Czech/Slovak Mission is headquartered in Prague. It emcompases the countries of Czech Republic and Slovakia. The Bratislava Slovakia District serves the members in Slovakia and has 309 members in four branches (Bratislava, Kosice, Trenčín, and Žilina).

Temples
As of February 2023, the Czech Republic was part of the Freiberg Germany Temple district.

See also

Religion in the Czech Republic
cs:Církev Ježíše Krista Svatých posledních dnů

References

External links
Newsroom - Czech Republic
 ComeUntoChrist.org Latter-day Saints Visitor site
 The Church of Jesus Christ of Latter-day Saints Official site

Christianity in the Czech Republic
1929 establishments in Czechoslovakia
1929 in Christianity
Czech Republic
Czech Republic